Anna Yukiko Ivan Miller (born January 17, 1966) is an American former professional tennis player.

Ivan grew up in Palo Alto, California, and played varsity tennis for Stanford University from 1984 to 1985. She quit the team over tensions with her coach, soon after she had been suspended indefinitely over claims she wasn't adjusting to the team atmosphere.

On the professional tour, Ivan reached a career high ranking of 39 in the world. At the 1985 U.S. Clay Court Championships she scored an upset win over Kathy Horvath en route to the quarter-finals, where she was beaten in three sets by second seed Zina Garrison. She won her way through to the fourth round of the 1986 Lipton International Players Championships, which included a win against the fifth seeded Bonnie Gadusek.

For a period between 1986 and 1988 she had to sit out of professional tennis for two years due to a series of injuries, the most serious of which was a 20-foot fall she took from a roof while cleaning a gutter, only narrowly avoiding paralysis. Having landed on her head, she was rendered unconscious by the fall and broke several bones, in her wrists, feet and face.

References

External links
 
 

1966 births
Living people
American female tennis players
Stanford Cardinal women's tennis players
Tennis people from California
Sportspeople from Palo Alto, California
20th-century American women